Partow-e Sokhan is a Persian language weekly newspaper published by the Imam Khomeini Educational Research Institute in Qom.

References

1998 establishments in Iran
Publications established in 1998
Iranian news websites
Newspapers published in Iran
Imam Khomeini's Educational and Research Institute
Persian-language newspapers